The Crossbows Act 1987 is an Act of the Parliament of the United Kingdom, which is still in force. The Act, as amended, controls the possession of crossbows by people under the age of eighteen throughout the whole of the United Kingdom. It gained royal assent on 15 May 1987, and came into force two months later.

Provisions of the Act

Section 1 of the Act made it an offence to knowingly sell or hire a crossbow (or part of a crossbow) to a person under the age of seventeen; section 2 created the converse offence of buying or hiring a crossbow whilst underage.

Section 3 made it an offence for someone under the age of seventeen to possess a functioning crossbow, or of sufficient parts to make a functioning crossbow, unless under the supervision of an adult. Section 4 gave a police constable the power to search someone or their vehicle, if they suspected an offence was being committed under section 3; to detain someone for the purpose of this search; and to confiscate any crossbow or part of a crossbow which was found.

A person guilty of an offence under section 1 was liable for up to six months imprisonment or a fine up to level five on the standard scale; a person guilty of an offence under sections 2 or 3 was liable for a fine of up to level three on the standard scale. On conviction, the court could order any crossbow or components involved to be forfeited or destroyed.

Amendments

Section 44 of the Violent Crime Reduction Act 2006 amended the Act, raising the minimum age for possession from seventeen to eighteen; in Scotland, the same change was implemented by Section 62 of the Custodial Sentences and Weapons (Scotland) Act 2007.

References

United Kingdom Acts of Parliament 1987
Firearm laws